Sergey Sergeyevich Kravtsov (born March 17, 1974, Moscow, RSFSR) is a Russian politician and Minister of Education of the Russian Federation since January 21, 2020.

Doctor of Education (2007), Associate Professor. Acting State Advisor to the Russian Federation, Grade 3 (2013). Head of the Federal Service for Supervision in Education and Science (Rosobrnadzor) from August 8, 2013, to January 21, 2020.

Biography
He was born March 17, 1974, in Moscow.

In 1996, he graduated with honors from Moscow State Open Pedagogical University (since 2006 - Sholokhov Moscow State University for Humanities, in 2015 he joined the Moscow State Pedagogical University) with a degree in “teacher of mathematics and computer science”. From 1994 to 1996, he worked as a mathematics teacher at School No.176 in Moscow.

In 1999 he defended his thesis "Methodology for conducting classes with lagging students in mathematics using multimedia technology." In 2000, he graduated from the Moscow State Institute of International Relations with a degree in state and municipal government with knowledge of a foreign language.

In 2002, he began working at the Ministry of Education of the Russian Federation. From 2004 to 2008, he was an assistant to the head of the Federal Service for Supervision in Education and Science .

In 2007, he defended his thesis for the degree of Doctor of Pedagogical Sciences on the topic “Theory and practice of organizing specialized training in schools of the Russian Federation” at the Institute of Content and Methods of Education of the Russian Academy of Education (official opponents A. V. Barannikov, V. I Blinov and V. S. Danyushenkov; according to the Dissernet community, the dissertation contains large-scale borrowings that are not framed as citations, including from unauthorized sources).

In 2008, he was appointed Director of the Federal State Institution “Federal Testing Center”, which was developing the procedure for conducting the Unified State Exam. In 2009, he headed the Institute of Education Management of the Russian Academy of Education.

In April 2011, he was appointed Director of the Regional Development Department of the Ministry of Education and Science of the Russian Federation; also in 2011, he acted as the rector of the federal state institution "Academy for Advanced Studies and Professional Retraining of Education Workers". In July 2012, he was appointed Director of the Department of Program Management and Competition Procedures of the Ministry of Education and Science.

On August 8, 2013, by order of the Government of the Russian Federation, he was appointed to the post of head of the Federal Service for Supervision of Education and Science, replacing Ivan Muravyov at this post. From October 28, 2017, to May 24, 2018, he served as Deputy Minister of Education and Science of the Russian Federation and head of Rosobrnadzor, since the department was subordinate to the Ministry of Education and Science. In 2018, the Federal Service for Supervision of Education and Science was reassigned to the Government. On May 24, 2018, Kravtsov was again appointed its head.

On January 21, 2020, by presidential decree he was appointed to the post of Minister of Education of the Russian Federation in Mikhail Mishustin's Cabinet.

In June 2022nd, Ukraine imposed personal sanctions on Kravtsov as a member of the Russian government due to the Russian invasion of Ukraine.

Family
Kravtsov's parents, Alla Kravtsova and Sergey Braun, own a number of apartments in the Czech Republic.

References

External links

1974 births
Living people
Russian politicians
Moscow State Institute of International Relations alumni